Carl Campe (16 August 1894 – 8 September 1977) was a German politician of the German Party (DP) and former member of the German Bundestag.

Life 
He was a member of the German Bundestag from 23 January 1950, when he succeeded his late party friend Friedrich Klinge, until 8 January 1952. He resigned his mandate to become the first Ambassador of the Federal Republic of Germany to Chile.

Literature

References

1894 births
1977 deaths
Members of the Bundestag for Lower Saxony
Members of the Bundestag 1949–1953